Scoparia yamanakai is a moth in the family Crambidae. It was described by Inoue in 1982. It is found in China (Hubei, Jilin), Japan and Russia.

References

Moths described in 1982
Scorparia